Erika Wedekind, complete named Frida Marianne Erica Wedekind, also Erika Oschwald, (13 November 1868 – 10 October 1944) was a German operatic soprano. She came from the  family. She was married since 1898 to the Kgl. Privy Councillor Walther Oschwald.

Life and career 
Born in Hanover, Wedekind grew up at Lenzburg Castle in the Swiss canton of Aargau, which had been purchased by her father – a general practitioner. Although she was celebrated by the local press for her successful stage performances as a young girl in Lenzburg and Aarau, her father refused to allow her to train as a singer and forced her to train as a teacher. It was only after his death that she graduated from the Dresdner Konservatorium from 1891 to 1894, initially with Gustav Scharfe (until his death in 1892) and studied singing with the famous soprano and music teacher Aglaja Orgeni.

Wedekind made her debut in 1894 as Frau Fluth in The Merry Wives of Windsor by Otto Nicolai and in the same year received her first engagement at the Dresdner Hofoper, where she was a celebrated coloratura soprano until 1909. Due to her great success, which also took her to international stages, she was given the official title of "Royal Saxon Kammersängerin".

Wedekind took part in the world premiere of the opera Die Schönen von Fogaras by Alfred Grünfeld, as well as in the Dresden premiere of Engelbert Humperdinck's Hänsel und Gretel. After she left the Dresden Court Opera in the same year, performances as a concert singer predominantly followed. Her brothers, the writers Donald and Frank Wedekind, who had no professional success at the time, received occasional financial support from her sister.

Wedekind was one of the first female coloratura sopranos in Germany and an outstanding representative of her field. She gave more than a thousand performances in Germany, Prague, Moscow, St Petersburg, Budapest, Stockholm, Paris and London before becoming an internationally sought-after singing teacher between 1914 and 1930. From 1930 she lived in seclusion in Switzerland, where she died in Zurich in 1944 at the age of 75.

Awards 
In 1909 she was awarded the civic gold medal Bene merentibus by the Ministry of the Royal House of Saxony for her achievements.
 Königlich-sächsische Kammersängerin in Dresden
 Grossherzoglich-hessische Kammersängerin in Wiesbaden

Further reading 
 Ludwig Eisenberg: Erika Wedekind. In Großes biographisches Lexikon der deutschen Bühne im XIX. Jahrhundert . Paul List, Leipzig 1903.
 : Frank Wedekind: Eine Männertragödie. Knaus, Munich 2008, .

References

External links 

 
 

German operatic sopranos
1868 births
1944 deaths
Musicians from Hanover